Mike Weisgram is a business owner and a Republican member of the South Dakota House of Representatives who has been representing District 24 since January 12, 2021.

Election history

2020 Weisgram was elected with 7,786 votes; Will Mortenson was also elected with 8,410 votes and Amanda Bachmann received 3,079 votes.

References

Living people
Republican Party members of the South Dakota House of Representatives
21st-century American businesspeople
21st-century American politicians
Year of birth missing (living people)